In mechanical engineering, a compliant mechanism is a flexible mechanism that achieves force and motion transmission through elastic body deformation. It gains some or all of its motion from the relative flexibility of its members rather than from rigid-body joints alone. These may be monolithic (single-piece) or jointless structures. Some common devices that use compliant mechanisms are backpack latches and paper clips. One of the oldest examples of using compliant structures is the bow and arrow.

Design methods 
Compliant mechanisms are usually designed using two techniques:

Kinematics approach 
Kinematic analysis can be used to design a compliant mechanism by creating a pseudo-rigid-body model of the mechanism. In this model, flexible segments are modeled as rigid links connected to revolute joints with torsional springs. Other structures can be modeled as a combination of rigid links, springs, and dampers.

Structural optimization approach 
In this method, computational methods are used for topology optimization of the structure. Expected loading and desired motion and force transmission are input and the system is optimized for weight, accuracy, and minimum stresses. More advanced methods first optimize the underlying linkage configuration and then optimize the topology around that configuration. Other optimization techniques focus topology optimization of the flexure joints by taking as input a rigid mechanism and replacing all the rigid joints with optimized flexure joints. To predict the behavior of the structure, finite-element stress analysis is done to find deformation and stresses over the entire structure.

Other techniques are being conceived to design these mechanisms. Compliant mechanisms manufactured in a plane that have motion emerging from said plane are known as lamina emergent mechanisms.

Advantages 
Compliant structures are often created as an alternative to similar mechanisms that use multiple parts. There are two main advantages for using compliant mechanisms:

 Low cost: A compliant mechanism can usually be fabricated into a single structure, which is a dramatic simplification in the number of required parts. A single-piece compliant structure can be manufactured through injection molding, extrusion, and 3d printing, among other methods. This makes the manufacturing relatively cheap and accessible.
 Better efficiency: Compliant mechanisms do not suffer from some issues that affect multi-bodied mechanisms, such as backlash or surface wear. Due to the usage of flexible elements, compliant mechanisms can easily store energy to be released at a later time or transformed into other forms of energy.

Disadvantages 
The full range of a mechanism depends on the material and geometry of the structure; due to the nature of flexure joints, no purely compliant mechanism can achieve continuous motion such as found in a normal joint. Also, the forces applied by the mechanism are limited to the loads the structural elements can withstand without failure. Due to the shape of flexure joints, they tend to be locations of stress concentration. This, combined with the fact that mechanisms tend to perform cyclic or periodic motion, can cause fatigue and eventual failure of the structure. Also, since some or all of the input energy is stored in the structure for some time, not all of this energy is released back as desired. However, this can be a desirable property to add damping to the system.

Applications 
Some of the oldest uses of compliant structures date back to several millennia. One of the oldest examples is the bow and arrow. Some designs of catapults also made use of the flexibility of the arm to store and release energy to launch the projectile larger distances. Compliant mechanisms are used in a variety of fields such as adaptive structures and biomedical devices. Compliant mechanisms can be used to create self-adaptive mechanisms, commonly used for grasping in robotics. Since robots require high accuracy and have limited range, there has been extensive research in compliant robot mechanisms. Microelectromechanical systems are one of the main applications of compliant mechanisms. These systems benefit from the lack of required assembly and simple planar shape of the structure which can be easily manufactured using photolithography.

The flexible drive or resilient drive, often used to couple an electric motor to a machine (for example, a pump), is one example. The drive consists of a rubber "spider" sandwiched between two metal dogs. One dog is fixed to the motor shaft and the other to the pump shaft. The flexibility of the rubber part compensates for any slight misalignment between the motor and the pump. See rag joint and giubo.

Image gallery

See also
Stiffness
Remote center compliance
Living hinge
Flexure bearing
Self-adaptive mechanisms

References

External links
Why Machines That Bend Are Better – YouTube video by Veritasium
 - YouTube video - A Computational Design Tool for Compliant Mechanisms by Disney Research Hub
 - BYU Compliant Mechanisms Research
Compliant Finray gripper for high-speed robotic electrical plug assembly – YouTube video

Mechanisms (engineering)